Kanden Kadhalai is a 2009 Indian Tamil-language romantic comedy film directed by R. Kannan. The film, a remake of the 2007 Hindi film Jab We Met, stars Bharath and Tamannaah. The film was released on 30 October 2009. This film was a commercial success. It was dubbed in Telugu as Priya Priyathama.

Plot
Shakthi becomes the managing director of Rajasekhar group of companies following his father's death. He feels highly dejected because of troubles surrounding him such as continuous loss in business and also his girlfriend Anita ditches him and marries another guy. Sakthi's estranged mother, who eloped when he was 13, is suing him for business shares.

Bombarded with troubles, Shakthi one day leaves his office and boards a train without even knowing the destination. In the train, Shakthi meets Anjali, who is more bubbly and talkative and she is on her way back to her hometown Theni after completing her studies. Anjali keeps talking to Shakthi continuously which irritates him. Shakthi plans to jump from the fast moving train to end his life, but due to Anjali's presence, he could not do it. Anjali informs Shakthi that she is in love with Gautham and also about her plans to elope with him as her family is highly orthodox.

At night, Anjali finds Shakthi missing in train but spots him sitting in the platform of a station. Anjali gets down from the train to bring Shakthi back but both end up missing the train. Anjali pressurizes Shakthi to help her board the train in the next station as it was because of him she had missed the train. Shakthi and Anjali hires a cab till the next railway station but Anjali misses the train there too. Finally Shakthi and Anjali stay in a lodge and plan to leave early next day to Theni. Slowly friendship develops between Shakthi and Anjali. Shakthi is in awe of Anjali's fun loving attitude.

Shakthi informs about his personal problems to Anjali while Anjali asks him to forget about all those things and lead a happy life. She also says that there is no harm in Shakthi's mother choosing to remarry at this age. Shakthi realizes his mistake. Shakthi and Anjali reach Theni and Anjali's family request Shakthi to stay at their place for a week. Shakthi agrees and is treated with affection by Anjali's relatives.

Meanwhile, Anjali's wedding is planned with her relative Mokkarasu which she does not like and she decides to run away from her house to meet Gautham in Ooty. Shakthi agrees to accompany Anjali till Ooty and both leave the home. Anjali's family members mistake that Anjali has eloped with Shakthi. Shakthi now having fallen in love with Anjali but not revealing it to her reluctantly drops her in Ooty, and despite her resistance, tells her their journey together is over and bids her farewell, returning to Chennai with plans of reviving his ailing businesses.

Now Shakthi is more energetic and positive minded, which he learnt from Anjali and he suggests many improvements in his business. He also accepts his mother's decision in her life, makes her the Chairwomen of his companies and gets close to her. Ten months pass by and Shakthi's company's shares have performed extremely well. Shakthi speaks about his company's new product telecomm plan in an ad which is seen by Anjali's parents. Anjali's father Ramana comes to Chennai to meet Shakthi and enquires about his daughter. Shakthi gets shocked that Anjali has lost contact with her parents for the last 10 months.

Shakthi promises to bring back Anjali and he leaves to Ooty immediately in search of her. On meeting Gautham, Shakthi finds that Gautham asked Anjali to get back to her home immediately as he cannot convince his father at that time. Gautham says that he did not try reaching Anjali as he was busy with his new business. Shakthi is shocked and begins to roam around Ooty in search of Anjali and finally finds that she works in a school.

Shakthi meets Anjali and asks her to return with him to Theni. But Anjali refuses and says that she trusted Gautham so much but Gautham's first priority was business and not her. Also Anjali refuses to get back to home as she made them feel bad by eloping from home. Shakthi convinces Anjali to return. On the day of their return, Gautham comes and apologizes to Anjali. Shakthi, Anjali and Gautham leave to Theni.

To their surprise, a grand welcome ceremony is planned at Anjali's home believing that Anjali and Shakthi are married already. They also mistake Gautham as Shakthi's friend who has decided to accompany him. Anjali's family members also plan a reception for Shakthi and Anjali. Gautham pressurizes Anjali to disclose the truth but Anjali cannot which makes her realize that she loves Shakthi more. Gautham asks Shakthi to leave the place fearing that Anjali might change her mind and Shakthi leaves to the railway station. But Anjali runs to the railway station and proposes her love to Shakthi which he too accepts. Shakthi and Anjali unite at the end.

Cast

 Bharath as Sakthi
 Tamannaah as Anjali (Voice dubbed by Chinmayi)
 Santhanam as Mokkai Rasu
 Sapan Saran as Roja
 Munna as Gautham
 Kamala Krishnaswamy as Sakthi's mother
 Nizhalgal Ravi as Ramana
 Sudha as Anjali's mother
 Deepa Venkat as Anjali's sister-in-law
 Ravichandran as Anjali's grandfather
 Azhagam Perumal as Perumal
 Manobala as Mayil Vaganam
 Shammu as Anita
 Singamuthu as Periappa
 Pandu as Ramanathan
 Mayilsamy
 Thambi Ramaiah as Police
 Lollu Sabha Jeeva as Arjun (cameo)

Production
Initially the remake had Dhanush and Shriya Saran in the lead as Dhanush thought that she would be the best choice for the role. Later both the lead actors opted out due to Dhanush and Shriya Saran's busy schedule and were replaced by Bharath and Tamannaah. Date problems were cited as the reason behind these changes.

Critical reception
Indiaglitz, while stating this, commented that Tamannaah was the backbone of the whole movie and she emotes to her best. Behindwoods mentioned that the chemistry of the lead pair (which is the moving force of the film) worked well and that Tamanna and Bharath looked fresh and different in their roles. Sify and Nowrunning.com both reviewed that the movie was a cute love story and is definitely worth a watch.

Soundtrack

The soundtrack was released on 14 August 2009. Vidyasagar was the music director, while lyrics written by Na. Muthukumar, Yugabharathi and Madhan Karky. It was released by Imtiaz Ali. The two mega-hit numbers were "Suthudhu Suthudhu" and "Ododi Poren."

The album has 6 tracks.

References

External links
 

Films shot in Ooty
Tamil remakes of Hindi films
2009 films
2000s Tamil-language films
Films scored by Vidyasagar
Indian romantic comedy films
2009 romantic comedy films
Films directed by R. Kannan